DeVry Advantage Academy and CLC at H.P. Carter was a high school in the Fifth Ward of Houston, Texas, operated in conjunction with DeVry University. It was in the former Carter Career Center/Wheatley High School/E.O. Smith Education Center building. The school offered students the opportunity to receive a high school diploma and a degree in web graphic design at the same time. It opened in 2011 and closed in 2012.

History
It opened in 2011, replacing the Contemporary Learning Center. HISD initially qualified for a $3 million (about $ when adjusted for inflation) grant to improve the CLC program, and the grant was to be distributed over a three-year period. CLC qualified for a grant intended to transform schools having problems, because CLC on repeated occasions did not meet federal academic standards. The district had spent $3 million to improve the former H.P. Carter Career Center building. The original plan was for DeVry University faculty to teach at the school. Nine teachers were HISD DeVry teachers.

The school received fewer students than expected. Fewer than 50 students had enrolled. 11 participated in the DeVry program. Because of this, only one floor of the campus was occupied, and some extra laptop computers and technological items, which had been acquired with the grant funds, had never been removed from their boxes for student use. In addition, the Texas Education Agency lowered the grant money level to $1.6 million (about $ when adjusted for inflation). Few of the 400 students who had previously attended CLC transferred to DeVry. Tracey Lewis, the principal of the DeVry school, said that the new location may have discouraged some of the earlier CLC students. Terry Grier, the HISD superintendent, agreed with Lewis's hypothesis. Carol Mims Galloway, a former HISD board member, said that the program was "set up for failure in the beginning."

In December 2011, the school announced that, due to the lower than expected enrollment, four of the HISD DeVry teachers would have no classes in the northern hemisphere spring of 2012. Because they were under contract, they continued to report to school and receive payment from HISD. One DeVry HISD teacher took another job. In April 2012 the school board approved the school's closure. Because HISD closed the school, it had to forfeit $529,000 (about $ when adjusted for inflation) in grant money. The district planned to make arrangements for students who were currently in the DeVry program to continue participating in it. Ericka Mellon of the Houston Chronicle said "Closure also would leave the future of the [Carter campus] uncertain."

Uniforms
The school required students to wear school uniforms.

References

External links

 DeVry Advantage Academy

High schools in Houston
DeVry University
Former high schools in Houston
Public high schools in Houston
Houston Independent School District high schools
2011 establishments in Texas
2012 disestablishments in Texas
Educational institutions established in 2011
Educational institutions disestablished in 2012
Defunct schools in the Houston Independent School District